FC Maiak Chirsova is a Moldovan football club based in Chirsova, Moldova. They play in the Moldovan "B" Division, the third division in Moldovan football.

League results

Achievements
Divizia B
 Winners (1): 2011–12 (South)
 Runners-up (1): 2010–11 (South)

External links
Unofficial website 
Official website
FC Maiak on Soccerway.com

Football clubs in Moldova
Football clubs in Gagauzia
1952 establishments in the Moldavian Soviet Socialist Republic
Association football clubs established in 1952